Birgitta Johansson (born 4 July 1943) is a Swedish orienteering competitor. She won a silver medal in the relay event at the 1972 World Orienteering Championships in Jičín, together with Ulla Lindkvist and Birgitta Larsson, and finished eighth in the individual event.

References

1943 births
Living people
Swedish orienteers
Female orienteers
Foot orienteers
World Orienteering Championships medalists